Haripur gada or Haripurgarh is the capital of the erstwhile Mayurbhanj State in India. It is located in Badsahi Block of the Mayurbhanj district, on the bank of the Budhabalanga river.

References

Mayurbhanj district
History of Odisha
Archaeological sites in Odisha
Archaeological monuments in Odisha